Justice Murdock may refer to:

Glenn Murdock (born 1956), associate justice of the Alabama Supreme Court
John S. Murdock (1871–1946), associate justice of the Rhode Island Supreme Court